Spoto High School is a public high school located in Riverview, Hillsborough County, Florida, serving the communities of Progress Village and Clair-Mel. It operates as a part of the Hillsborough County Public Schools system. It opened in August 2006, with the main purpose of the school to relieve overcrowding at Riverview High School, also located in Riverview, and East Bay High School in nearby Gibsonton. It also pulled students from Brandon High School and Bloomingdale High School. The school population for 2008-2009 was 1,460 students.

Demographics
Spoto HS is 40% Black, 35% Hispanic, 18% White, 2% Asian, <1% Native American, and 5% multiracial.

Notable alumni
 Geronimo Allison, NFL wide receiver for the Atlanta Falcons

References

External links
Spoto High School

High schools in Hillsborough County, Florida
Public high schools in Florida
2006 establishments in Florida
Educational institutions established in 2006